Lebanon Summer 1982 is the title and subject of a mural-scale painting made by Nabil Kanso in 1982 on the Sabra and Shatila massacre during the Lebanese Civil War. It is oil on canvas measuring 3 X 5.5 meters (10 x 18 feet)

See also
Lebanon painting
Endless Night

References

External links
Lebanon Summer 82 painting

Modern paintings
War paintings
Anti-war paintings
1982 paintings
Paintings by Nabil Kanso